The Teikokutō (lit. Empire Party) was a political party in Japan. It was active from 1899 until 1905.

History
The party was established on 5 July 1899 as a successor to the Kokumin Kyōkai. It initially had 21 seats and was supportive of the government and army, calling for increased military spending. In the 1902 elections it won 17 seats, retaining all 17 in the 1903 elections and going on to win 19 in the 1904 elections.

In December 1905 it merged with the Kōshin Club and the Liberal Party to form the Daidō Club.

References

Defunct political parties in Japan
Political parties established in 1899
1899 establishments in Japan
Political parties disestablished in 1905
1905 disestablishments in Japan